Ildikó Kelemen-Kovács (born 19 November 1962) is a Hungarian diver. She competed at the 1980 Summer Olympics and the 1988 Summer Olympics.

References

External links
 

1962 births
Living people
Hungarian female divers
Olympic divers of Hungary
Divers at the 1980 Summer Olympics
Divers at the 1988 Summer Olympics
Divers from Budapest
Sportspeople from Budapest